Johann Anton Alban Ramboux (5 October 1790, Trier - 2 October 1866, Cologne) was a German painter and lithographer.

Life 
His father came from Savoy and his mother was from a famous family of goldsmiths. Christoph Hawich, his drawing teacher at the Bürgerschule (a type of commercial preparatory school) in Trier noted his artistic talent. As a result, in 1803 he received a recommendation to study with Jean-Henri Gilson (1741-1809), a former Benedictine monk who taught art in Florenville. 

After four years there, he received a further recommendation to study with Jacques-Louis David in Paris, where Ramboux remained until 1812. In 1815, he was admitted to the Academy of Fine Arts, Munich, becoming a pupil of Konrad Eberhard.

In 1816 he moved to Rome, where he lived until 1822. While there, he made the acquaintance of many fellow painters who were involved in the Nazarene movement. He returned to Trier for ten years, creating hundreds of watercolors of the city and the Moselle River, which he began reproducing as lithographs in 1825. This came to an end in 1827 when the lithography firm, owned by his former teacher, Hawich, went out of business. In 1832, he began another ten-year stay in Italy, producing landscapes and folk-scenes as well as copies of Renaissance frescoes and mosaics.

Work in Cologne 
In 1843, a curator was needed for the Wallraf Collection (now the Wallraf-Richartz Museum) in Cologne and Ramboux was recommended for the position by Johann Gottfried Schadow. He was appointed and took office in 1844. Ten years later, he was able to make a long-desired pilgrimage to Jerusalem, producing hundreds of watercolors and lithographs along the way. In 1858, he was made the first Honorary Citizen of Trier.

A street is named after him in the Longerich district of Cologne. Since 1961, the City of Trier has awarded the Ramboux Prize to promote the development of young artists.

Selected writings 
 Beiträge zur Kunstgeschichte der Malerei (Contributions to the History of Painting, Cologne, 1860 (300 pages)
 Umrisse zur Veranschaulichung altchristlicher Kunst in Italien vom Jahr 1200–1600 (Outline of Early Christian Art in Italy), Cologne, 1854 (125 pages)

References

Further reading 
 Christina A. Schulze: Museum Ramboux - Eine italienische Stilgeschichte in Kopien von Johann Anton Ramboux (1790 - 1866) an der Königlichen Kunstakademie Düsseldorf (1841 - 1918), Dissertation, Vienna 2011.
 Johann Anton Ramboux. Maler und Konservator. 1790–1866. Wallraf-Richartz-Museum, Cologne 1966.
 Eberhard Zahn: Johann Anton Ramboux in Trier. Spee-Verlag, Trier 1980.
 Jens Christian Jensen: Aquarelle und Zeichnungen der deutschen Romantik. DuMont Buchverlag, Cologne 1992, .
 Trierer biographisches Lexikon, Landesarchivverwaltung Koblenz (2000) , pg. 353
 Édouard Hizette, Johann Anton Ramboux : fils spirituel d'Abraham Gilson, Weyrich édition, 2013.

External links 

 
 
 Ramboux Prize @ "Volksfreund" (regio-wiki)

1790 births
1866 deaths
19th-century German painters
19th-century German male artists
German male painters
Nazarene movement
People from Trier